Austin Leigh was a British stage and film actor.

Selected filmography
 Brigadier Gerard (1915)
 Beau Brocade (1916)
 The Temptress (1920)
 Desire (1920)
 Adventures of Captain Kettle (1922)
 Old Bill Through the Ages (1924)
 Bulldog Drummond's Third Round (1925)

References

External links

Year of birth missing
Year of death missing
British male film actors
British male silent film actors
British male stage actors
20th-century British male actors